Cortland is a city and the county seat of Cortland County, New York, United States. Known as the Crown City, Cortland is in New York's Southern Tier region. As of the 2020 census it had a population of 17,556. 

The city of Cortland, near the county's western border, is surrounded by the town of Cortlandville.

History 
The city is within the former Central New York Military Tract. It is named after Pierre Van Cortlandt, the first lieutenant governor of New York.

Cortland, settled in 1791, was made a village in 1853 (rechartered in 1864), and incorporated in 1900 as New York's 41st city. When the county was formed in 1808, Cortland vied with other villages to become the county seat. Forty stars representing the 40 cities incorporated before Cortland circle the State of New York and Crown on the city's official seal. The seven points of the crown represent the seven valleys surrounding Cortland. The 41st star in the center of the crown illustrates Cortland as the incorporated city closest to New York's geographic center.

Cortland's leading industry in the late 19th and early 20th centuries was the Wickwire Brothers wire-drawing mill, noted for its production of wire hardware cloth for use as window screens. The extent of the Wickwires' wealth is demonstrated in the two magnificent mansions they commissioned. The Victorian Chateauesque-style home of Chester Wickwire is now operated as the 1890 House Museum & Center for Victorian Arts. Charles Wickwire's 1912 home is now owned and operated by the SUNY Cortland Alumni Association. It is open to the public and used by the Alumni Association to host college-related events and house visiting dignitaries.

Cortland was also the location of Brockway Motor Company, a pioneering truck maker. Begun in 1875 as Brockway Carriage Works, it was taken over by Mack Trucks in 1956 and survived until 1977. The city continues to host an annual show of Brockway trucks.

From 1960 to 1992, Smith Corona typewriters were manufactured in Cortland.

Cortland boasts a classic octagon house. The Cortland Rural Cemetery is styled as a garden setting and is still in operation.

In 1868, Cortland became the home of the Cortland Normal School, which gradually developed into a four-year college. With graduate programs and research capacity, it has expanded into the State University of New York at Cortland.

In 2006, Cortland's historic clock tower burned down. It was later rebuilt, with spaces in the building for both businesses and apartments.

The Cortland County Courthouse, Cortland County Poor Farm, Cortland Fire Headquarters, Cortland Free Library, First Presbyterian Church Complex, William J. Greenman House, Randall Farm, Tompkins Street Historic District, Unitarian Universalist Church, and United States Post Office are listed on the National Register of Historic Places.

Notable people
 Carl Carmer, author
 Charles Henry De Groat, Union Army brigadier general
 William Dillon, composer, lyricist, and vaudevillian
 Ronnie James Dio, former frontman for Rainbow and Black Sabbath; street in Cortland is named for him (Dio Way)
 Nancy Duffy, Syracuse news personality and founder of the Syracuse St. Patrick's Day Parade
Katharine May Edwards, Wellesley College professor and classics scholar
Alice Cately Etting, owner and manager of the city's Cately and Etting Wagon company from 1898 to 1916, developer of a device to raise and lower folding carriage covers and an organizer of the city's American Red Cross chapter.
  Florence Campbell Fitzgerald, former Chairwoman of the Cortland County Board of Supervisors (now called the Cortland County Legislature), was the second woman in the state elected to lead a county board when she took office in 1969.
Col. Arnald Gabriel, Commander and Conductor of US Air Force Band, US Air Force Symphony Orchestra, and Singing Sergeants.
 Chester Gillette, convicted of the 1906 murder of Grace Brown of Cortland, his girlfriend, in highly publicized and controversial trial; executed in 1908.
 Milo Goodrich, former US congressman.
 Charles W. Goodyear, businessman and railroad owner.
 Leidy Klotz, retired soccer player; professor, author.
 Jim Mahady, former Baseball second baseman for the New York Giants.
 Dennis Mepham, retired soccer player.
 Nathan Lewis Miller, former governor of New York.
 Gideon C. Moody, former senator of South Dakota.
 Mark Nauseef, musician.
 Alton B. Parker, Democratic candidate for president in 1904.
 Myrtie (or Myrtle) Pearl Pennoyer (1878-1953), a city philanthropist known for her volunteer work at The King's Daughters Home for Children, the local chapter of the American Red Cross, creating a scholarship through the YWCA in memory of her daughter Laura, volunteering with the Cortland County Historical Society and the Women's Christian Temperance Union. Pennoyer was the adopted daughter of Cortland residents George and Lydia G. Pennoyer and Pearl Street, located between Warren and Tompkins streets, is named after Pennoyer.
Andy Shay, head coach of lacrosse at Yale
Sime Silverman, publisher.
 Eric Soderholm, former professional baseball player.
 Dr. Julia H. Spalding, a doctor who started a homeopathic medical practice specializing in chronic illnesses in Cortland in 1883.
Elmer Ambrose Sperry, inventor of gyroscopic compass who held over 400 patents; USS Sperry is named after him.
 Aljamain Sterling, UFC bantamweight, MMA fighter.
Joel Eric Suben, composer and conductor.
 Raymond Gram Swing, journalist.
 Samuel Ringgold Ward, African-American who escaped enslavement to become an abolitionist, newspaper editor and Congregational minister.
 Susan West, the first female Supervisor on the Cortland County Board of Supervisors, was elected to that body in 1941.
Dr. Edith Irene Flower Wheeler, a city physician who worked in Cortland starting in 1922, served as the president of the Cortland County Medical Society and the vice-president of the Women's Medical Society of New York. 
Spiegle Willcox, jazz trombone player, composer, and singer.
 Gary Wood, NFL quarterback.
 Beer Mike.

Geography
Cortland is in west-central Cortland County at  (42.600658, −76.181284). Cortland lies between Syracuse and Binghamton; it is surrounded by the town of Cortlandville.

The Tioughnioga River, a tributary of the Susquehanna River, flows southward past the city.

Transportation

Roads and highways
Interstate 81, U.S. Route 11, and New York State Route 281 are north-south highways servicing the city. New York State Route 13 and New York State Route 41 also serve the city. NY-13 leads southwest  to Ithaca.

Bus
Local public transportation by bus is provided by Cortland Transit. Greyhound and Trailways of New York provide the city with intercity bus service with connections to Syracuse, Binghamton, and points beyond. OurBus connects Cortland to Binghamton, New York City, and other destinations. The closest Amtrak train station is in Syracuse.

Air
Air service is provided by Cortland County Airport located west of the city.

Climate
Cortland has a humid continental climate (Koppen Dfa), with cold, snowy winters and warm summers.

Demographics

As of the census of 2000, there were 18,740 people, 6,922 households, and 3,454 families residing in the city. The population density was 4,778.6 people per square mile (1,845.8/km2). There were 7,550 housing units at an average density of 1,925.2 per square mile (743.6/km2). The racial makeup of the city was 95.72% White, 1.56% African American, 0.25% Native American, 0.57% Asian, 0.02% Pacific Islander, 0.56% from other races, and 1.33% from two or more races. Hispanic or Latino of any race were 1.72% of the population.

There were 6,922 households, out of which 24.8% had children under the age of 18 living with them, 34.7% were married couples living together, 11.4% had a female householder with no husband present, and 50.1% were non-families. 36.0% of all households were made up of individuals, and 13.0% had someone living alone who was 65 years of age or older. The average household size was 2.28 and the average family size was 2.95.

In the city, the population was spread out, with 18.3% under the age of 18, 28.4% from 18 to 24, 23.6% from 25 to 44, 16.8% from 45 to 64, and 12.9% who were 65 years of age or older. The median age was 28 years. For every 100 females, there were 88.4 males. For every 100 females age 18 and over, there were 84.5 males.

The median income for a household in the city was $26,478, and the median income for a family was $39,167. Males had a median income of $29,857 versus $21,614 for females. The per capita income for the city was $14,267. About 13.9% of families and 24.7% of the population were below the poverty line, including 24.8% of those under age 18 and 15.2% of those age 65 or over.

As of 2015 the largest self-reported ancestry groups in Cortland, New York were:
English - 15.6%
Irish - 10.8%
Italian - 9.7%
German - 8.4%
"American" - 5.7%
Dutch - 2.2%
Scottish - 2.1%
French (except Basque) - 1.8%
Polish - 1.8%

Government

Cortland's government consists of a mayor, who is elected at large, and an eight-member city council. One member is elected from each of the eight voting wards. As of January 2022, the mayor was Mayor Scott Steve and the eight alderpersons that comprise the city's Common Council are:

 Wayne Schutt, First Ward
Kathryn Silliman, Second Ward
Mary Clare Pennello, Third Ward
Pat Lane, Fourth Ward
Seth Thompson, Fifth Ward
Bill Carpenter, Sixth Ward
Troy Beckwith, Seventh Ward
Thomas Michales, Eighth Ward
The City Clerk is Andy Jewett. The City Attorney is A.J. Meldrim.

Sports
In 2009, the New York Jets' training camp was moved from Hofstra University in Hempstead to the SUNY Cortland campus. The camp drew in 34,000 visitors and brought nearly $4.26 million to the local economy. In 2010, the Jets signed a three-year contract with SUNY Cortland. In 2015, they moved back to their own facility in Florham Park, New Jersey.

See also 

 Cortland County, New York
 Cortlandville, New York
 Cortland station

References

Further reading
 Raus, Edmund J. Banners South: Northern Community at War (2011), about Cortland.

External links
 City of Cortland official website
 Cortland City School District
 SUNY Cortland College
Cortland Public History
 Early history of Cortland area
 Cortland business guide
 The 1890 House Museum and Center for Victorian Arts
 Cortland Rural Cemetery
 Cortland Historical Society
  Crown City Marketing

County seats in New York (state)
Cities in New York (state)
Populated places established in 1791
Cities in Cortland County, New York
1791 establishments in New York (state)